Richard Ross Jr. is an American law enforcement officer who served as the Commissioner of the Philadelphia Police Department from January 2016 to August 2019.

Commissioner Ross was born and raised in Philadelphia. Following allegations of sexual harassment and racial and gender discrimination within the police department, he announced his resignation on August 20, 2019.

Ross graduated from Central High School (Philadelphia) before going on to earn an undergraduate degree in Labor & Industrial Relations from Penn State University, and a Master’s Degree in Criminal Justice from Saint Joseph’s University.

References

External links
 
 Philadelphia Police Blog
 Philadelphia Police Facebook
 Philadelphia Police Twitter
 

Commissioners of the Philadelphia Police Department
Philadelphia Police Department officers
Government of Philadelphia
Living people
Pennsylvania State University alumni
Saint Joseph's University alumni
Year of birth missing (living people)
 Central High School (Philadelphia) alumni